WHV may refer to:

 Warner Home Video, the home video distribution division of Warner Bros. Home Entertainment Group, itself part of Warner Media
 Wilhelmshaven, code used on German vehicle registration plates

See also
 Woodchuck hepatitis virus